A  is a subdivision of several towns in Italy. Terzieri are most commonly met with in Umbria, as for example at Trevi, Spello, Narni and Città della Pieve; towns divided into terzieri in other regions include  Lucca in Tuscany, Ancona and Macerata in the Marches. The medieval Lordship of Negroponte, in the island of Euboea, was also divided into three distinct rulerships, which were known as terzieri.

Other Italian towns with more than three official neighborhoods are frequently divided into analogous quartieri (4, whence the English word "quarter" to mean a neighborhood) or sestieri (6); some towns merely refer to these neighborhoods by the non-number-specific rioni. Terzieri, quartieri, sestieri, rioni, and their analogues are usually no longer administrative divisions of these towns, but historical and traditional communities, most often seen in their sharpest relief in the town's annual palio.

See also
 Circoscrizione
 Contrade
 Frazione
 Località
 Rione
Rioni of Rome
 Quartiere
 Sestiere

Subdivisions of Italy